SPPS can refer to:
Saint Paul Public Schools
Solid phase peptide synthesis
Solution precursor plasma spray
Steam Powered Preservation Society
South Park Primary School, a primary school in London, United Kingdom
Scandinavian Plant Physiology Society
Social Psychological and Personality Science, a quarterly academic journal for social and personality psychology-related topics
Spectral Parameter Power Series, a method for solving Sturm–Liouville equations
Super Proton-Antiproton Collider (SpS), a modification of the Super Proton Synchrotron, an accelerator at CERN